Swell (New York Art Show) is a survey of art inspired by surf and beach culture, curated by Tim Nye and Jacqueline Miro. The exhibition opened to the public on July 1, 2010 at the three locations in Chelsea, NY and included work by many members of the group of Venice Beach artists known as Light and Space and Finish Fetish.

The show focuses on beach culture and its influence on the Beat Generation, Assemblage, Light and Space, Finish Fetish, and early Pop Art.

One of the themes of the show is the relationship between Shapers and the Finish Fetish movement of the 60′s. The show focuses on two cities, L.A. and New York, and attempts to place the Ocean and its proximity to both cities as an antidote to a cacophony of quantities, speed and competing images. It also addresses how later generations of artists have looked back at assemblage, ephemera and graffiti as a way to either incorporate or reject the presence of branding, advertisement, and information technology.

Locations
nyehaus
Metro Pictures
Friedrich Petzel Gallery

Artists

Billy Al Bengston
Charles Arnoldi
Jay Batlle
Larry Bell
Wallace Berman
Ashley Bickerton
Sandow Birk
Olaf Breuning
Thomas Campbell
Vija Celmins
Bruce Conner
Ron Cooper
Jim Evans
Joe Goode
Gary Hill
Dennis Hopper
Craig Kauffman
Ed Kienholz
Robert Longo
Sister Mary Corita
John McCracken
Ed Moses
Catherine Opie
Ken Price
Ed Ruscha
Dirk Skreber
Craig Stecyk
Fred Tomaselli
DeWain Valentine
John Van Hamersveld
Timothy Williams
Chris Gentile

References

External links
http://www.wwd.com/eyescoop/eye/surf-city-3165805
http://skateandannoy.com/2010/06/swell-art-show-in-nyc/
http://www.elledecor.com/entertaining-travel/articles/surf-s
http://www.coolhunting.com/culture/swell.php
http://www.whitewallmag.com/2010/07/13/swell/
http://www.brooklynsurfer.com/

Art in Greater Los Angeles
Art exhibitions in the United States